The 12871 / 12872 & 22861 / 22862 Ispat Express is a Superfast day train of Indian Railways connecting Kolkata with Titlagarh & Kantabanji. It has Two Second Class Unreserved Seating Coaches, 3 AC 3 Tier Coaches, 2 AC Chair Car Coaches and 8 Second Sitting Chair Car Coaches. All of the classes require reservations, except for Second Class Unreserved Seating class, where Tatkal scheme is available. A pantry car is available in this train. Unlike many trains of Indian Railways, it has an advance reservation period of sixty (60) days.

Traction
It is hauled by WAP-7 locomotive from  electric loco shed on its entire journey.

When it was first opened, it ran from Howrah to Jamshedpur. Later, it was extended to Rourkela, Jharsuguda, Sambalpur and then to Titlagarh. After a fifth change, its destination station was changed from Titlagarh to Kantabanji.

Rake Composition
It is running with LHB coach. Advance Reservation Period is of 60 days. Coach composition (18 coaches) is as follows :-
 1 Seating cum Luggage coach
 1 Power Generator Car (EOG)
 2 Unreserved accommodation
 8 Second Sitting Coaches
 2 AC Chair Car
 3 AC Three Tier
 1 Pantry Car

Route & halts

 
 
 
 
 
 
 
 
Kantabanji

Schedule

 Train runs daily for both the direction

References
 https://web.archive.org/web/20131125225205/http://www.indianrail.gov.in/

Rail transport in Howrah
Rail transport in Odisha
Express trains in India
Rail transport in West Bengal
Rail transport in Jharkhand
Named passenger trains of India